Jonathan William Panzo (born 25 October 2000) is an English professional footballer who plays as a defender for EFL Championship club Coventry City, on loan from Premier league club Nottingham Forest.

Early and personal life
Panzo was born in Brockley, London to parents from the Ivory Coast.

Club career

Monaco
After playing for Chelsea, whom he joined at the age of 9, Panzo moved to Monaco in July 2018. He made his senior debut for their reserve team in the Championnat National 2. Panzo made his first team debut for Monaco on 19 December 2018, playing the full ninety minutes in 1–0 win over Lorient in the Coupe de la Ligue.

Cercle Brugge (loan)
On 30 August 2019, Panzo joined Belgian club Cercle Brugge on a season-long loan.

Dijon
In August 2020 he was linked with a return to the UK, with interest reported from Championship teams Coventry City, Derby County and Swansea City. Later that month, however, he was said to be close to remaining in France and transferring to Dijon. He eventually signed with club on 26 August 2020, for an undisclosed fee.

Nottingham Forest
On 31 January 2022, it was announced that Panzo had signed with Nottingham Forest of the EFL Championship managed by his former England U-17 coach Steve Cooper.

Coventry City (loan)

On 13 July 2022, Panzo joined Coventry City on loan for the 2022–23 season.

International career
Panzo was part of the England U17 team which finished as runners-up to Spain in the 2017 UEFA European Under-17 Championship. He then went on to be part of the squad who beat Spain to win the 2017 FIFA U-17 World Cup. Panzo also represented England at under-19 level. He served as captain of the under-19 team.

On 30 August 2019, Panzo was included in the England U21 squad for the first time and made his debut during the 3-2 2021 U21 Euro qualifying win against Turkey on 6 September 2019.

Career statistics

Honours
England U17
FIFA U-17 World Cup: 2017
UEFA European Under-17 Championship runner-up: 2017

Individual
UEFA European Under-17 Championship Team of the Tournament: 2017

References

2000 births
Living people
English people of Ivorian descent
English footballers
Black British sportspeople
England youth international footballers
Chelsea F.C. players
AS Monaco FC players
Cercle Brugge K.S.V. players
Dijon FCO players
Nottingham Forest F.C. players
Coventry City F.C. players
Championnat National players
Ligue 1 players
Association football defenders
English expatriate footballers
English expatriate sportspeople in France
Expatriate footballers in France
English expatriate sportspeople in Monaco
Expatriate footballers in Monaco
English expatriate sportspeople in Belgium
Expatriate footballers in Belgium
Belgian Pro League players
Championnat National 3 players
English Football League players